Vanessa Short Bull (born December 30, 1978) is an American beauty pageant titleholder who served as both Miss South Dakota USA (2000) and Miss South Dakota (2002).

Personal life
Vanessa Short Bull was born in Pine Ridge, South Dakota to Thomas (former state senator and current president of Oglala Lakota College) and Darlene Short Bull. Short Bull is an Oglala Sioux Native American, a descendant of Ghost Dance leader Arnold Short Bull.

Her family is from the Pine Ridge Reservation, although she hasn't been living there since she was 6 and currently resides in Rapid City, South Dakota. She took ten years of ballet classes at New York City's Alvin Ailey American Dance Theater.

Pageantry
Short Bull was the first Native American to have the title of Miss South Dakota, winning the title in 2002.

References

Sources
bio of Short Bull

1978 births
Living people
Miss America 2003 delegates
American beauty pageant contestants
People from Pine Ridge, South Dakota
Oglala people
21st-century Native American women
21st-century Native Americans